The 2019 Dallas municipal election was an election to determine the mayor and all 14 city council members in Dallas, Texas. The election day was May 4, 2019  If no candidate takes a majority of over 50% of the total vote, the two top vote-earners will advance to a runoff election on June 8. Incumbent mayor Mike Rawlings is unable to run for reelection due to term limits.

Mayor

Results

District 1

District 2

District 3

District 4

District 5

District 6

District 7

District 8

District 9

District 10

District 11

District 12

District 13

District 14

References

Dallas municipal

Dallas
Dallas municipal elections
2010s in Dallas